Hargrave is an unincorporated community in Rush County, Kansas, United States.  It is located approximately 7 miles west of La Crosse on the north side of K-4 highway next to the Kansas and Oklahoma Railroad.

History
Hargrave had a post office between the 1890s and 1950.

Education
The community is served by La Crosse USD 395 public school district.

References

Further reading

External links
 Hargrave - a Dead Town in Rush County, Kansas Agland
 Rush County maps: Current, Historic, KDOT

Unincorporated communities in Rush County, Kansas
Unincorporated communities in Kansas